Cyana bigutta is a moth of the family Erebidae. It was described by Timm Karisch in 2005. It is found in Kenya.

References

Endemic moths of Kenya
Cyana
Moths described in 2005
Moths of Africa